The Wytheville Cubs was the final name of the minor league baseball teams located in Wytheville, Virginia between 1948 and 1989. An affiliate of the Chicago Cubs from 1985 to 1989, the Wytheville Cubs were a member of the Rookie level Appalachian League. Previous Wytheville teams played as members of the Blue Ridge League (1948-1949) and Appalachian League (1953-1955, 1957–1965, 1967, 1969, 1971–1973).

History

The Wytheville Cubs finished with their best record in their first year, when they went 39–31, finishing third in the 1985 Appalachian League.

Previously, Wytheville was home of the Wytheville Braves (1971-1973), Wytheville Senators (1960, 1965, 1969), Wytheville Reds (1967), Wytheville A's (1964), Wytheville Twins (1961-1963), Wytheville Cardinals (1957-1959), Wytheville Statesman (1949, 1953–1955) and Wytheville Pioneers (1948). Wytheville was an affiliate of the Chicago Cubs (1985–1989), Atlanta Braves (1971-1973), Washington Senators II (1965, 1969), Cincinnati Reds (1967), Kansas City A's (1964), Minnesota Twins (1961-1963), Washington Senators I (1960), St. Louis Cardinals (1957-1959), Baltimore Orioles (1954), and St. Louis Browns (1953).

Alumni include Jerome Walton, Tony Oliva, Reggie Smith, Joe Rudi, and Jeff Burroughs.

After the 1989 season, the Wytheville Cubs moved to Huntington, West Virginia to become the Huntington Cubs.

The 1960 Wytheville Senators captured the Appalachian League Championship.

The ballpark
Wytheville teams played at Withers Field. Constructed in 1948, the ballpark hosted all Wytheville minor league teams during its existence. The ballpark was repurposed in 1993 to become a public park, renamed Withers Park. Its grandstand and brick exterior are still in existence today within the park and a plaque recognizes the home plate location. The address is 300 North 4th Street, Wytheville, Virginia, 24382.

Year-by-year Cubs record

Notable franchise alumni

Alex Arias (1987)
Jeff Burroughs (1969) 2x MLB All-Star; 1974 AL Most Valuable Player
Frank Castillo (1987)
Matt Franco (1987-1988)
Julio Gotay (1957)
Jack Hamilton (1957)
Pete Mackanin (1969)
Charlie Manuel (1963) Manager: 2008 World Series Champion-Philadelphia Phillies
Derrick May (1986)
Tony Oliva 3x MLB All-Star; 1964 AL Rookie of the Year; 3x AL Batting Title (1964, 1965, 1971)
Biff Pocoroba MLB All-Star
Joe Rudi 3x MLB All-Star
Ellie Rodríguez (1964) 2x MLB All-Star
Reggie Smith 7x MLB All-Star
Dave Tomlin (1967)
Jerome Walton (1986) 1989 NL Rookie of the Year

References

External links
The Baseball Cube

Defunct Appalachian League teams
Defunct baseball teams in Virginia
Professional baseball teams in Virginia
Chicago Cubs minor league affiliates
Baseball teams established in 1985
1985 establishments in Virginia
1989 disestablishments in Virginia
Sports clubs disestablished in 1989